In High Profile is an album by pianist Dick Katz which was recorded in 1984 and released on the Bee Hive label.

Reception

The AllMusic review by Scott Yanow stated, "Through the years, pianist Dick Katz through played an important role behind the scenes on many recording dates, including notable sets by Helen Merrill and Lee Konitz. He has led relatively few sessions of his own, making this quintet outing with Frank Wess, trombonist Jimmy Knepper, bassist Marc Johnson and drummer Al Harewood a special occasion".

Track listing

Personnel
Dick Katz – piano
Jimmy Knepper – trombone (tracks 1, 3, 6 & 8)
Frank Wess – tenor saxophone, flute (tracks 1, 3, 6 & 8) 
Marc Johnson – bass
Al Harewood – drums

References

Dick Katz albums
1982 albums
Bee Hive Records albums
Albums produced by Bob Porter (record producer)